Naousa or Naoussa may refer to:

Naousa, Imathia, a town in Imathia, Macedonia, Greece
Naousa massacre, 1822
Naoussa F.C., a football club
Naousa, Paros, a village on the island of Paros, in the Cyclades, Greece